The Sea Storm is an Italian homebuilt amphibious flying boat that was designed and produced by Storm Aircraft of Sabaudia. Storm Aircraft was originally called SG Aviation srl. When it was available the aircraft was supplied as a kit for amateur construction.

Design and development
The Sea Storm features a cantilever shoulder-wing, a two-seats-in-side-by-side configuration, with four seats optional, an enclosed cockpit under a hinged canopy, retractable conventional landing gear and a single engine in pusher configuration. There are two small airfoil sponsons for water balance mounted low on the fuselage. The aircraft has a highly swept fin and rudder.

The aircraft wings are made from aluminum sheet with some fibreglass parts, while the hull is composite.

The manufacturer estimated the construction time from the supplied kit as 700 hours or 550 hours from the quick-build kit.

Operational history
By 1998 the company reported that 25 kits had been sold and 12 aircraft were completed and flying.

In February 2014 one example was registered in the United States with the Federal Aviation Administration, although two had been registered at one time.

Specifications (Sea Storm)

References

External links
Photo of the two seat version
Photo of the four seat version
Sea Storm review

Sea Storm
1990s Italian sport aircraft
1990s Italian ultralight aircraft
1990s Italian civil utility aircraft
Single-engined pusher aircraft
Shoulder-wing aircraft
Homebuilt aircraft